Arganovo is a rural locality (a village) in Korobitsynskoye Rural Settlement, Syamzhensky District, Vologda Oblast, Russia. The population was 29 as of 2002.

Geography 
Arganovo is located 35 km east of Syamzha (the district's administrative centre) by road. Chirkovskaya is the nearest rural locality.

References 

Rural localities in Syamzhensky District